Pettyjohn was an unincorporated community in Marion County, West Virginia, United States. Founded by Captain David Morgan in 1776. The town had its own ferry, salt works, mail drop, trading post, and David built one of his many houses here.

References 

Unincorporated communities in West Virginia
Unincorporated communities in Marion County, West Virginia